The Thurston Teal is a family of two- and four-seat all-aluminium amphibious aircraft designed by David Thurston in the United States and first flown in 1968.

A total of 38 Teals were manufactured.

Development
The Teal design features a high wing with tip floats for lateral stability. The horizontally opposed engine is mounted tractor fashion in a strut-supported pylon above the wing root. The T-tail includes a water rudder and tailwheel that swings up against the bottom of the rudder. Conventional undercarriage includes flat, spring-steel main undercarriage legs that rotate aft for water landings. The aircraft was designed to be very rugged and simple, with manually operated flaps and landing gear. The conventional (taildragger) configuration was chosen to make beaching the aircraft more practical, with no nosewheel to be damaged when running up on shore. The aircraft may be left floating with the mainwheels extended, to act as fenders to the bottom.

Pilot and passenger sit side by side under a clear perspex canopy. Side windows slide up into opening overhead windows.

One unusual characteristic of the Teal design is that it cruises slightly faster with the landing gear in the down position than with it up. The Teal's wheels do not retract, but instead swing to the rear until the gear is horizontal and clear of the water. The drag produced having the landing gear stowed in the up position is higher than in the extended position, and this reduces cruise speed.

Production
David B. Thurston established Thurston Aircraft Corporation at Sandford, Maine, in 1966 to produce a lightweight amphibian of his own design, which had the designation Thurston TSC-1A Teal.

First flown in 1968, production began after certification was gained in August 1969; the 16th and subsequent aircraft, which introduced some refinements, were designated TSC-1A1 Teal. In 1972 David Thurston joined the Schweizer Aircraft Corporation, which continued to build the Teal in the form of the TSC-1A2 Teal II before selling the production rights to the Teal Aircraft Corporation of Markham, Ontario, in early 1976. This last company built a developed TSC-1A3 Marlin before running out of financial steam in early 1979.

Before the Schweizer acquisition, Thurston had designed, in conjunction with an aviation magazine, a landplane version designated TSC-2 Explorer, and Marvin Patchen Inc., which financed this development, acquired the production rights for this aircraft, planning to build civil and law-enforcement versions as the Explorer and Observer respectively. Subsequently, Dr Maitland Reed's National Dynamics (Pty) Ltd of Durban, South Africa, acquired this project from Patchen, but later decided not to build either version of this aircraft.

Thurston Aircraft produced  a total of 19, Schweizer built 12 and Teal Aircraft constructed seven.

Variants

TSC-1 T-boat
The TSC-1 T-Boat was a proposed flying boat. The aircraft was to have no landing gear to save weight and folding wings were to be incorporated to aid storage. The model development was discontinued to concentrate on the amphibious TSC-1A instead.

TSC-1A
The TSC-1A was the first to the series to actually be completed and featured retractable conventional landing gear and non-folding wings. The prototype TSC-1A was registered as N1968T, given serial number 1 and was first flown in June 1968. Fifteen Model TSC-1A Teals were built by the Thurston Aircraft.

TSC-1A1
The TSC-1A1 Teal Amphibian was an improved model with extra range and payload. The aircraft incorporated 23 US gallon fuel tanks in the wing leading edges, which replaced the single 24.5 US gal fuselage tank of the earlier TSC-1A. The prototype TSC-1A, N1968T was upgraded and used as the prototype for the TSC-1A1. The TSC-1A1 was certified on 23 September 1971 and Thurston Aircraft built the first three. Three more were built by Schweizer Aircraft. Six additional existing TSC-1As were upgraded to TCS-1A1 status.

TSC-1A1/EW
The TSC-1A1/EW introduced wing and tailplane extensions.

TSC-1A1/EW/EP
The TSC-1A1/EW/EP was a project to convert existing TSC-1A1s to TSC-1A1/EW status by incorporating the EW's wing and tail extensions and upgrading the engine to a  Lycoming O-320-B3B.

TSC-1A2 Teal II and Marlin 150

The TSC-1A2 Teal II was  a development of the TSC-1A1, It incorporated slotted flaps, a change in horizontal stabilizer incidence and larger elevator trim tab travel. The fitted engine was a  Lycoming O-320-A3B. The TSC-1A2 was certified on 28 June 1973, including IFR in non-icing conditions. Schweizer built nine Teal IIs and seven were built by Teal Aircraft as the "Marlin 150".

TSC-1A2/EP
The TSC-1A2/EP was a proposed upgrade of the TSC-1A2 a  Lycoming O-320-B3B engine.

TSC-1A3 Teal III and Marlin 180

The TSC-1A3 was a proposed  up-engined version of the TSC-1A2. It was developed by Teal Aircraft and was to be sold by the name "Marlin 180" during 1977–78. The Teal III incorporated aerodynamic and structural upgrades to the engine mounting pylon and the engine cowling.

TSC-1A3/EW
The TSC-1A3/EW was a proposed  engine aircraft with the wings and tailplane extensions of the TSC-1A1/EW.

TSC-1A3/EWF
The TSC-1A3/EWF was a proposed aircraft that would have been identical to the TSC-1A3/EW, except with flaps.

TSC-1A2T Teal II & TSC-1A3T Teal III

In 1983 there was a proposal to form a new company, to be called Advanced Aircraft, which would develop a tricycle version of the Teal, to be designated the TSC-1A2T. This was to be a conversion of existing TSC-1A2 aircraft. The conversion would have included:

 relocating the main landing gear
 removing the tail wheel
 installing a nose wheel
 changing the hull to accommodate the new landing gear
 changing the rudder
 simplifying the flap controls
 installing of new style cabin doors

An up-engined version, designated TSC-1A3T, would have been powered by either 160 Lycoming O-320 or Lycoming O-360  conversion. In the end the company was not formed and the prototype never completed.

TSC-1A4 Teal IV
None were ever built.

Specifications (TSC-1A1 Teal)

References

External links

Thurston Teal information
Thurston Teal information and photos

1960s United States civil utility aircraft
Amphibious aircraft
High-wing aircraft
Schweizer aircraft
Teal
T-tail aircraft
Single-engined tractor aircraft
Aircraft first flown in 1968
Flying boats